Almere Parkwijk is a railway station which lies in Almere, in the Netherlands. It is located approximately 24 km east of Amsterdam. It is on the Weesp–Lelystad railway. The station is on the newest polder in the Netherlands, the Flevopolder which is in the Flevoland province. The station was opened on 1 February 1996. Although the station was built 9 years after the other Almere stations it is styled in the same way as Almere Muziekwijk and Almere Buiten.

Almere has become a commuter city for Amsterdam. The first house was built in 1976 and on 7 July 2008, it was recorded that there were 184 405 citizens living in Almere. The station lies in the centre of the 'Parkwijk' the Park Estate and the 'Verzetswijk'.

Train services
, the following train services call at this station:
Local Sprinter services Hoofddorp - Schiphol Airport - Amsterdam Zuid - Almere Oostvaarders
Local Sprinter services The Hague - Schiphol Airport - Amsterdam - Weesp - Almere - Lelystad - Zwolle

Bus services
5: Muziekwijk - Kruidenwijk - Almere Centrum - Parkwijk - Landgoederenbuurt - Station Buiten - Oostvaarders
6: Noorderplassen - Kruidenwijk - Almere Centrum - Danswijk - Parkwijk
7: Almere Centrum - Parkwijk - Tussen de Vaarten - Sallandsekant
155: Holendrecht - Bijlmer ArenA - Bijlmermeer - Muiden P&R - Almere Gooisekant - Almere Parkwijk
216: Almere Buiten - Almere Stad - Muiden - Amstelveen - Schiphol Oost
322: Amsterdam Amstel - Muiden P&R - Almere Poort - Gooisekant - Almere Parkwijk
323: Amsterdam Bijlmer ArenA - Muiden P&R - Almere Poort - Gooisekant - Almere Parkwijk

Night Buses

External links
NS website 
Dutch Public Transport journey planner 

Parkwijk
Railway stations opened in 1996
Railway stations on the Flevolijn